The eighteenth series of the Ojarumaru anime series aired on NHK since April 1, 2015. This is the first series to air on Wednesday through Friday, instead of Monday through Friday.

The series' opening theme is "Utahito" (詠人) by Saburō Kitajima. The ending theme is "Wakaran" (わからん I Don't Know) by Zainichi Funk.

Episodes

References

Ojarumaru episode lists